The Lacq gas field is a natural gas field located in Aquitaine. It was discovered in 1950 and developed by and Total S.A. It began production in 1958 and produces natural gas and condensates. The total proven reserves of the Lacq gas field are around 8.8 trillion cubic feet (251 km³), and production is slated to be around 1 billion cubic feet/day (35×105m³).

Geology
The Lacq Gas Field is a structural trap located in an anticline which formed in the southern part of Aquitaine Basin starting in the Cretaceous until the Tertiary with the Arzacq syncline to the north and the Eocene flysch trough in front of the Pyrenees foothills to the south.  The field is 16 km long and 10 km wide with oil produced beneath a Tertiary unconformity  at 700 m and gas, with high hydrogen sulfide content, beneath a pre-Cretaceous unconformity at about 4000 m.  The anticline was identified with two exploration geophysics electric lines in 1943 and a magnetotelluric survey in 1943, a gravimetric survey in 1944 and a reflection seismology survey in 1947, which led to the Lacq No. 1 well in 1949.  The stratigraphic column begins with the Lower Jurassic Liassic at about 4700 m followed by the Late Jurassic Dogger, the gas producing dolomite in the Portland Group, Purbeckian-Waeldian sandstone, and Valanginian-Neocomian limestone and dolomite,  followed by the Albian-Aptian marls and limestones.

References

Natural gas fields of France